Roger Henrique Kath  (traditional Chinese: 卡夫) born on 18 February 1984, is an association football goalkeeper for TSW Pegasus FC. He used to play for FC Santa Cruz in Brazil. He will compete for the goalkeeper position with Japanese goalkeeper Hisanori Takada.

References

Living people
TSW Pegasus FC players
1984 births
Association football goalkeepers
Hong Kong First Division League players
Place of birth missing (living people)
Hong Kong footballers